Theodoros Deligiannis was a Greek politician, minister and member of the Greek Parliament, who served as Prime Minister of Greece five times from 1885 to 1905.

He led the Nationalist Party, which, alongside the New Party led by his primary political opponent, Charilaos Trikoupis, formed the two-party system of the time.

Life 
He was born at Kalavryta. He studied law in Athens, and in 1843 entered the Ministry of the Interior, of which department he became permanent secretary in 1859. In 1862, on the deposition of King Otto, he became minister for foreign affairs in the provisional government. In 1867, he was Greek Minister at Paris. On his return to Athens he became a member of successive cabinets in various capacities, and rapidly collected a party around him consisting of those who opposed his great rival, Charilaos Trikoupis. He eventually became the leader of the Nationalist Party after Alexandros Koumoundouros.

In the so-called Oecumenical Ministry of 1877 he voted for war with Turkey, and on its fall he entered the cabinet of Koumoundouros as minister for foreign affairs. He was a representative of Greece at the Berlin Congress in 1878. From this time forward, and particularly after 1882, when Trikoupis again came into power at the head of a strong party, the duel between these two statesmen was the leading feature of Greek politics.

Diligiannis first formed a cabinet in 1885; but his warlike policy, the aim of which was, by threatening Turkey, to force the Great Powers to make concessions in order to avoid the risk of a European war, ended in failure. For the powers, in order to stop his excessive armaments, eventually blockaded the Piraeus and other ports, and this brought about his downfall. He returned to power in 1890, with a radical programme, but his failure to deal with the financial crisis produced a conflict between him and the king, and his disrespectful attitude resulted in his summary dismissal in 1892. Diligiannis evidently expected the public to side with him; but at the elections he was badly beaten.

In 1895, however, he again became prime minister, and was at the head of affairs during the Cretan crisis and the opening of the war with Turkey in 1897. The easy defeat which ensued though Diligiannis himself had been led into the disastrous war policy to some extent against his will caused his fall in April 1897, the king again dismissing him from office when he declined to resign. Delyanni kept his own seat at the election of 1899, but his following dwindled to small dimensions. He quickly recovered his influence, however, and he was again president of the council and minister of the interior when, on 13 June 1905, he was assassinated in revenge for the rigorous measures taken by him against gambling houses. His attacker, a professional gambler named Antonios Gherakaris, stabbed him with a dagger in the abdomen as he was entering the parliament. The incident took place at 5pm; an emergency operation failed to stop his internal bleeding and Diligiannis died at 7.30pm.

Notes

Sources
 Phantis

Further reading 
 Chatziioannou, Maria Christina. "Relations between the State and the Private Sphere: Speculation and Corruption in Nineteenth-century Greece. Mediterranean Historical Review, 1743-940X, Volume 23, Issue 1, 2008, pp. 1–14.

1820 births
1905 deaths
1905 murders in Greece
19th-century prime ministers of Greece
20th-century prime ministers of Greece
Greek nationalists
Eastern Orthodox Christians from Greece
National and Kapodistrian University of Athens alumni
Foreign ministers of Greece
Prime Ministers of Greece
Assassinated Greek politicians
Deaths by stabbing in Greece
Greek people of the Greco-Turkish War (1897)
History of Greece (1863–1909)
Ambassadors of Greece to France
Finance ministers of Greece
Ministers of the Interior of Greece
People from Langadia, Arcadia